Stenoma strenuella is a moth in the family Depressariidae. It was described by Francis Walker in 1864.

References

Moths described in 1864
Stenoma